Giovanni Melchiorre Calosso (1759 – November 21, 1830) was an Italian priest. He is significant due to his mention in John Bosco's memoirs for having assisted Bosco greatly in becoming a priest himself.

Biography 
Little to nothing is known concerning Giovanni Calosso's youth. Later in his life, he graduated from the University of Turin with a degree in theology, in 1782. In 1813, he became a guest of his brother and the priest of the town Berzano di San Pietro. Later, in his 70th year, in 1829, he relocated and became Murialdo's chaplain.

It was there, in Murialdo, that he met young John Bosco. He was impressed by the youth's ability to memorize and recite that day's sermon, so much so that he decided to instruct Bosco personally, so that Bosco could become a priest as he wished.

One year later, on November 21, 1830, Giovanni Calosso was struck by apoplexy while Bosco was out on an errand. On his death bed, he asked to see Bosco one last time. Bosco ran to Calosso's house, where, just before he died, unable to speak because of the pain, Calosso gave Bosco the key to a drawer, telling him that what it contained was for him, and him alone. At the funeral, Bosco gave the key to Calosso's grandnephews. Contained within the safe was six thousand lira, which Bosco refused to accept, overcome with the loss of his father-figure.

References 

People from the Province of Asti
Clergy from Turin
Salesian Order
1759 births
1830 deaths